The Men's 4 x 100 metre freestyle relay 49pts swimming event at the 2004 Summer Paralympics was competed on 23 September. It was won by the team representing .

Final round

23 Sept. 2004, evening session

Team Lists

References

M